Eichholzkopf is a mountain of Hesse, Germany. At an elevation of 610m, its peak is located near the local center Rittershausen, which is part of the municipality Dietzhölztal.

Mountains of Hesse
Lahn-Dill-Kreis